Valentyn Shevchenko (born 5 June 1948) is a Ukrainian athlete. He competed in the men's triple jump at the 1976 Summer Olympics, representing the Soviet Union.

References

1948 births
Living people
Athletes (track and field) at the 1976 Summer Olympics
Ukrainian male triple jumpers
Soviet male triple jumpers
Olympic athletes of the Soviet Union
Place of birth missing (living people)